Takbeer TV is a free-to-air Islamic TV Channel based in the United Kingdom. It can be viewed on Sky channel 749 as well as online and by certain satellite services. It was launched at a time when other Islamic channels were also being established.

Mission
Takbeer TV Channel's aim is to provide, represent and promote a positive outlook of Muslims & Islam and to act as an interface between Muslims & non-Muslims in order to remove the misconceptions people have about Islam.

Programming
Takbeer TV offers educational, current affairs, and entertainment programmes from an Islamic perspective. In October 2011, the channel began to air programming from Dawn News. Dawn News covers eighteen hours a day of the schedule, featuring news, current affairs shows such as 'News Night with Talat', 'Kab Tak' and 'Baat Nikaly Gee' and other shows e.g. 'Mast Morning With Maira',  'Sport Zone', 'A Taste of Fusion', '92[Identity]', 'Equinox' etc.

Controversy
In 2010 Ofcom received a complaint regarding the alleged abusive treatment towards the Ahmadiyya Muslim Community. Ofcom asked the licensee on several occasions to provide the recording for review. The licensee did not provide the recording and the channel was held in breach of broadcasting regulations. Takbeer TV has also been reprimanded by Ofcom for "inciting violence" against Ahmadiyya Muslim Community.

References

External links

Television channels and stations established in 2010
Television channels in the United Kingdom
Islamic television networks